In the run-up to the next Austrian legislative election, various organisations carry out opinion polling to gauge voting intentions in Austria. Results of such polls are displayed in this list; the date range for these opinion polls are from the 2019 Austrian legislative election, held on 29 September, to the present day. The next election is likely to be held in 2024.

VdMI quality criteria 
In 2017, the Association of Market and Opinion Research Institutes of Austria (VdMI) published quality standards for polls. While some frequent pollsters like Peter Hajek Public Opinion Strategies, IFES, IMAS, SORA, or Spectra are members of the VdMI, others like Unique Research are not, though they adhere to their quality standards. OGM used to be a member but was kicked out in late October 2021 for the use of online-only polling instead of a mix of phone and online polling. OGM argued that while a mixed method was ideal 15 years ago, today it is not necessary any longer, as 90% of households have internet access and younger voters cannot be reached by phone any longer. Other institutes are not members, such as Market or IFDD, and rely only on online polling. The polling company Research Affairs, which came under scrutiny amid the Kurz corruption probe, was never a member of the VdMI; they once applied for membership but were rejected because of inadequate methodology.

Graphical summary

Poll results

2023

2022 and older

By state

Vienna

Tyrol

Burgenland

Hypothetical polling

BIER run

HC run

Preferred Chancellor

Preferred coalition

See also 
 Opinion polling for the 2019 Austrian legislative election

References

External links 
 Twitter: @Wahlen_AT 
 @Wahlen_AT poll history 

Next
Austria